Night music may refer to:

Film and theater
 Night Music (play), a 1940 play by Clifford Odets
 A Little Night Music, a 1973 musical by Stephen Sondheim and Hugh Wheeler
 A Little Night Music (film), 1977 film adaptation of the musical

Albums and songs
 "Night Music", a 1990 song by the heavy metal band Dio from the album Lock Up the Wolves
 Nachtmusik (album), a 1990 album by Lightwave
 Night Music (Joe Jackson album), 1994
 Night Music (Woody Shaw album)
 "Night Music", a 1995 song by Simple Minds from the album Good News from the Next World

Other
 Night Music (1988-1990), a TV series hosted by David Sanborn featuring musicians from a wide variety of genres
 Eine kleine Nachtmusik (A Little Night Music), a 1787 composition by Wolfgang Amadeus Mozart
 Night music (Bartók), a stylistic evocation of night, found in the music of the Hungarian composer Béla Bartók
 nocturne, usually a musical composition that is inspired by, or evocative of, the night
 Night Music, a composition by George Crumb
 Nachtmusique, wind instruments early music ensemble